John James (born 7 March 1951) is a right-handed former professional tennis player from Australia.

James enjoyed most of his tennis success while playing doubles. During his career, he won two doubles titles.

Career finals

Singles (1 runner-up)

Doubles (2 titles, 7 runner-ups)

External links
 
 

Australian male tennis players
Australian Open (tennis) junior champions
Tennis players from Adelaide
1951 births
Living people
Grand Slam (tennis) champions in boys' doubles